The Guillemard Bridge (Malay: Jambatan Guillemard Jawi: جمبتن ڬويلليمارد) is a single track railway truss bridge located in Kusial, in the state of Kelantan, Malaysia. It is two of the oldest railway bridges in the country after Victoria Bridge in Perak. The bridge was constructed between May 1920 and July 1924 by The Metro Carriage Wagon & Finance Co of Wednesbury, England as a crossing over the Kelantan River. The bridge was officially opened on 1925 by Almarhum Sultan Muhammad IV of Kelantan and named after the British Governor for the Straits Settlements, Sir Laurence Guillemard. 

The 600m bridge, said to be the longest railway bridge in the country, is a technological marvel and is still standing strong after nearly a century. The strong, black solid steel bridge has a history worth telling.

In December 1941, at the start of the World War II in Malaya, the British forces retreating south to Kuala Krai, destroyed the last span of the bridge to prevent the Imperial Japanese Army advancing. It remained impassable to traffic until it was reconstructed and reopened to traffic on 7 September 1948.

The bridge was used by all vehicles until February 1988 when a new bridge, Tanah Merah Bridge was completed along Federal Route 4, a few kilometres away.

See also
 Transport in Malaysia

External links
Guillemard Bridge / Jambatan Sungai Kusial - Malaya Railway

Bridges in Kelantan
Railway bridges in Malaysia
Bridges completed in 1924